The ICC Super Series 2005 was a cricket series held in Australia during October 2005, organised by the International Cricket Council (ICC). It was played between Australia, the world's top-ranked side at the time, and a World XI team of players selected from other countries. The series consisted of three One Day Internationals and one Test match. Australia won all four matches.

The matches attracted small crowds and were not competitive, in part because the ICC World XI had only one warm-up game to gel as a team. The Super Series concept had been controversial from its first proposal. The ICC's intention was to showcase the world's best players and provide a close contest with Australia, who had dominated international cricket for several years. However, many fans and experts dismissed the Super Series as a gimmick, comparing it unfavourably with the 2005 Ashes Series.The ICC had intended to hold a Super Series every four years, but the concept was not repeated.

Background
In the late 1990s and early 2000s, the Australian cricket side had become completely dominant in world cricket, and had a reputation of being unbeatable. In this climate, the concept of gathering the world's best players into one team to challenge them was born, and the ICC Super Series was developed.

Fixtures
Warm-up match: Junction Oval, Melbourne, VIC
  ICC World XI vs. Victoria – 2 October
One Day Internationals: Telstra Dome, Melbourne, VIC
Game 1 – 5 October
Game 2 – 7 October
Game 3 – 9 October
Super Test: Sydney Cricket Ground, Sydney, NSW
14 to 19 October

Teams

Team Selectors - Australia

The Australian squads were announced on 20 September, and the axe fell on the lacklustre performers on the team during the recent Ashes series. Damien Martyn was dropped from the Test side in favour of Brad Hodge but retained his one-day spot. Stuart MacGill and Shane Watson, who toured England but did not play in any of the Ashes Tests, were included in the lineup. Jason Gillespie and Michael Kasprowicz were not included in the Test squad or the ODI squad, while James Hopes received a surprise call-up for the ODI side following his 146 in a first-class game for Australia A on their tour of Pakistan in September 2005.

Team Selectors - ICC World XI
The World XI selectors named a shortlist, from which the 11 Test players were named. The selection panel comprised:

Sunil Gavaskar of India (chairman)
Mike Atherton of England
Sir Richard Hadlee of New Zealand
Sir Clive Lloyd of the West Indies
Jonty Rhodes of South Africa
Aravinda de Silva of Sri Lanka

The shortlist they named was: Andrew Flintoff (England), Steve Harmison (England), Michael Vaughan (England), Rahul Dravid (India), Virender Sehwag (India), Sachin Tendulkar (India), Anil Kumble (India), Brendon McCullum (New Zealand), Daniel Vettori (New Zealand), Shoaib Akhtar (Pakistan), Inzamam-ul-Haq (Pakistan), Younis Khan (Pakistan), Mark Boucher (South Africa), Jacques Kallis (South Africa), Makhaya Ntini (South Africa), Shaun Pollock (South Africa), Graeme Smith (South Africa), Muttiah Muralitharan (Sri Lanka), Brian Lara (West Indies), Shivnarine Chanderpaul (West Indies)

The ICC World squads were announced on 23 August 2005, with additions on 23 September due to injuries to two players. Of the players in the final squads, five were from South Africa, three each were from England and Pakistan, two each were from India, Sri Lanka and West Indies, and one was from New Zealand. Zimbabwe and Bangladesh were unrepresented.

After first being reduced to 13, who travelled to Australia, the final 11 players to take the field were selected by the Chairman of Selectors, Sunil Gavaskar in consultation with the appointed team director, the coach and captain of the team, who will be appointed by the selection panel. The colour of the ICC World XI's uniform was predominantly blue and black. The coach of the team was India's former coach John Wright.

Squads for the Six Day Test Match 

Statistics are correct as of 19 October 2005, after the only Test match played to date by the World XI

Squads for the Three One-day Internationals

Status of the matches 

The International Cricket Council declared that the matches would count as official One Day Internationals and Test matches. Some previous matches, such as the series between England and the Rest of the World in 1970, were initially regarded as Test matches, perhaps in the interests of attracting a sponsor, but later stripped of Test status by the ICC. At first it was unclear whether the Super Series matches would be recognised as official internationals, but following the decision to recognise the World Cricket Tsunami Appeal match as an official ODI, the ICC decided to award official status to the Super Series matches too. Apart from fixtures in which Caribbean islands and territories of the former British empire compete together as the West Indies, this was the first official Test match not between two countries. This decision proved controversial among players and writers alike. 

Cricket historians have generally opposed the decision because of inconsistency in that the 1970 Rest of the World series in England is not accorded Test status, although those matches were advertised as Test matches at the time. Officially, however, Test status seems unlikely to be withdrawn from the 2005 Super Test in part because of the effect on noted cricket records; for instance without the wickets taken in this match, Muthiah Muralidaran would fall slightly short of 800 career test wickets. Statisticians such as Bill Frindall have said that they will not recognise the ruling and will exclude the matches from their records. Although it has been said that this "raises the possibility of two competing sets of cricket statistics being in circulation", that has always been a reality because there has never been a standard for match status and statisticians have always used their own match lists. 

Many current and former Test cricketers also joined in the debate. For example, former Australian captain Allan Border said: "I firmly believe that this status should be restricted to matches between national sides. Test cricket is an institution that has been built up over a period of 128 years, and it should not be tampered with". (Although arguably this overlooks the anomaly related to the West Indies, as well as the fact that Australia and South Africa both competed in what are now deemed test matches in the nineteenth century prior to formal political unification.)  Conversely, Tony Greig, who played for the Rest of the World against Australia in 1971–1972, said "My understanding of the status of first-class and Test cricket is related to the standard of the players. These are all Test cricketers... [The 1971–72 matches] were played like Tests and were deadly serious. "

The matches themselves were characterised by poor crowds (half empty grounds) and lacklustre performances by the World XI. Former England batsman Geoffrey Boycott described the series as a "bunfight" and said that there was "nothing that resembled cricket" in it.  The authoritative publication The Wisden Cricketer summed up the Test match as follows: " [it] was a terrible game of cricket. It had a small crowd, little meaning and was forgotten quickly." The World XI players seemed to be there more for fun than anything else. Andrew Flintoff came up with some refreshingly honest statements amidst all the bullish officials: "I've got the Super Series in two weeks' time. I can't think of anything worse," he said, adding on arrival; "I'm only here for the food."

Captain Graeme Smith admitted to frustration in the aftermath of the series, saying he found it hard to deal with the fact that there weren't any repercussions to 'losing so badly'

Match reports

Warm-up: Victoria v ICC World XI (2 October)

In a practice match preceding the first One Day International, a fifty over game was arranged against a strong Victorian side. The game was thirteen-a-side, but with only eleven players allowed to bat and eleven to field. Andrew Flintoff was allowed to rest, with the other World XI players all playing. By agreement the World XI batted first, but they fared badly as they collapsed from 63 for no loss to 131 for 6, with Shane Harwood taking 4 for 37. Rahul Dravid's knock of 66 off 80 balls and Shaun Pollock's cameo of 54 not out off only 38 balls rescued the innings, which finished on a competitive 281 for 8. Victoria came close in reply, with Brad Hodge top-scoring with 92 before succumbing to Muttiah Muralitharan.

Scorecard

First ODI: Australia v ICC World XI (5 October)

Australia won the toss and captain Ricky Ponting elected to bat first. They got off to a good start, with Gilchrist and Katich putting on 80 runs in only 14 overs before Gilchrist was bowled by Kallis. Katich and Ponting put on 48 in the next eight overs, and at 1 for 128 after 22.1 overs, Australia looked to be heading for a big score. But after that wickets fell regularly, with the spinners Muralitharan and Vettori working their way steadily through the middle order to restrict Australia to 8 for 255 at the end of their 50 overs.

The ICC World XI never looked like challenging this total. They lost five of their top six batsmen – Sehwag, Kallis, Lara, Dravid and Pietersen – for single figures, to collapse to 5 for 82 inside 22 overs. Only Sangakkara's innings gave any hope, but when he was out for 64 to leave the ICC World XI on 6 for 101, needing 7 runs an over off the last 22 overs, the game was over. Australia eventually wrapped up the ICC World XI's innings for 162 to record a comprehensive 93-run victory.

Scorecard

Second ODI: Australia v ICC World XI (7 October)

Australia won the toss and captain Ricky Ponting elected to bat first. They got off to a good start, with Gilchrist and Katich quickly putting on 110 runs before Katich was bowled by a doosra from Muralitharan. Gilchrist and Ponting put on 63, with Gilchrist reaching his century off 73 balls, before missing a straight Sehwag delivery. Martyn and Ponting consolidated in a 103-run stand, working singles around. On 276, Ponting failed to beat Flintoff to the stumps at the other end and Martyn was bowled next ball, giving the World XI a sniff. However, Andrew Symonds and Michael Clarke pushed the Australian total comfortably past 300, with 4 for 328 at the end of their 50 overs. Every bowler was taken to, except for Muralitharan, who finished with 1 for 43 off 10 overs.

The ICC World XI initially looked like challenging this total. Chris Gayle blasted a 48-ball half-century as the World XI reached 125 off only 16.1 overs. From then on however, they consistently lost wickets, due to insipid running between the wickets and a few soft dismissals, with Lara again hitting Nathan Bracken straight to Symonds at cover. 
The ICC World XI ended up being dismissed for 273, handing another victory to Australia.

Scorecard

Third ODI: Australia v ICC World XI (9 October)

Scorecard

Super Test: Australia v ICC World XI

Future
The original aim was that the Super Series would be played every four years. However, immediately after the completion of the first Test match, Malcolm Speed, the ICC Chief Executive, removed it from the regular ICC schedule, noting that it may be played in the future when there is a clear world champion.

See also
Rest of the World cricket team in England in 1970
Rest of the World cricket team in Australia in 1971–72
Test cricket
List of World XI ODI cricketers
List of World XI T20I cricketers

Notes

References

Bibliography
News about the ICC Super Series from Cricinfo
Association of Cricket Statisticians and Historians Representation to the ICC
Cricinfo bulletin on Victoria v World XI
World XI Test squad
Selection process

2005 in Australian cricket
Super
International cricket competitions in 2005
Multi-national cricket tours of Australia